Vilhelm Bjerke-Petersen (December 24, 1909 - September 13, 1957) was a Danish painter, writer, and art theorist.

Life
Born in Copenhagen, he studied under Axel Revold at the Norwegian National Academy of Fine Arts from 1927 to 1929, and then under Paul Klee and Wassily Kandinsky at Bauhaus Dessau from 1930 to 1931. He was a Surrealist painter, and agitated for the style in several publications. He influenced several painters, including Karen Holtsmark, Bjarne Rise and Johannes Rian. He lived in Sweden from 1944. He died of heart disease at the hospital in Halmstad, Sweden in 1957 at the age of 47.

Works

Books
 Symboler i abstract kunst (Symbols in Abstract Art), 1933
 Surrealismen (Surrealism), 1934
 Mindernes virksomhed

Paintings
 Le Monstre dans la femme appartient a la nuit
 L'actrice, 1935
 Kærlighedens vegetative triumf, 1943
 Fille du soleil, 1946

References

1909 births
1957 deaths
Danish surrealist artists
Bauhaus alumni
Oslo National Academy of the Arts alumni
Danish expatriates in Norway
Danish expatriates in Germany
Danish expatriates in Sweden
20th-century Danish painters